Havildar Bhim Bahadur Dewan was the leading section commander of 1/11 Gorkha Rifles under Captain Manoj Kumar Pandey, who was tasked to capture "Khalubar South" on 3 July 1999. He was awarded Vir Chakra (posthumously) for his contribution in Operation Vijay against Pakistani Army

Vir Chakra Citation
The citation for  the Vir Chakra reads as follows

Legacy
In the movie LOC Kargil, he was portrayed by Bollywood actor Puru Raaj Kumar.

References

1961 births
1999 deaths